"Another Place, Another Time" is a song written by Jerry Chesnut and originally recorded by Del Reeves.

Jerry Lee Lewis's cover became the title track of his 1968 Smash Records album Another Place, Another Time, whose B-side it opened, and was also released as a single, with "Walking the Floor over You" on the other side.

Based on the liner notes to the 2002 Raven Records reissue of Lewis's album, his cover became a top 5 hit, whereas Del Reeves's original was "unsuccessful".

Lewis's version would go all the way to number 4 and remain on the charts for 17 weeks.

Another cover was recorded in the same year by Arthur Alexander.

"Another Place, Another Time" is considered Lewis's comeback song. With this song he finally broke on the country charts, effectively ending his commercial slump.

According to a book by Ken Burke, the "one man responsible" for changing the fortunes of Jerry Lee Lewis' flagging career was Eddie Kilroy. It was Kilroy who suggested that Lewis record "Another Place, Another Time" with a more modern country sound, and the record kick-started Lewis's late 1960s career revival.

Jerry Lee Lewis's cover was nominated for a Grammy Award.

Critical reception 
Joe Viglione from AllMusic writes:

Track listing

Charts

See also 
 Another Place, Another Time (album)#Background

References 

1968 songs
1968 singles
Jerry Lee Lewis songs
Sun Records singles
American country music songs
Song recordings produced by Jerry Kennedy
Songs written by Jerry Chesnut